"Best Part" is a song by Canadian singer Daniel Caesar and American singer H.E.R., released in 2017 as a part of Caesar's album Freudian. It is also included in H.E.R.'s self-titled album, released in 2017.

Accolades
"Best Part" won Best Collaboration at the 2018 Soul Train Music Awards while also being nominated for The Ashford & Simpson Songwriter's Awards.

The song also won the Grammy Award for Best R&B Performance at the 61st Annual Grammy Awards.

Former US president Barack Obama included the song in his 2019 Summer Playlist.

Charts
"Best Part" is both artists' second single sent to the Adult R&B Songs (Billboard) to become number one, something achieved by only four other artists before them.

Weekly charts

Year-end charts

Certifications and sales

References

External links
 

2017 singles
2017 songs
Daniel Caesar songs
Songs written by Daniel Caesar
H.E.R. songs
Songs written by H.E.R.
Male–female vocal duets
RCA Records singles